Bossing & Ai is a Philippine television comedy game show broadcast by GMA Network. Hosted by Vic Sotto and Ai-Ai delas Alas, it premiered on September 24, 2017 on the network's Sunday Grande sa Gabi line up. The show concluded on February 4, 2018 with a total of 19 episodes.

Hosts

 Vic Sotto
 Ai-Ai delas Alas

Co-hosts
 Boobsie Wonderland
 Jelson Bay

Guests
 Jose Manalo
 Oyo Boy Sotto
 Tart Carlos
 Ciara Sotto
 Pauleen Luna
 Kristine Hermosa
 Philip Lazaro

Ratings
According to AGB Nielsen Philippines' Nationwide Urban Television Audience Measurement People in television homes, the pilot episode of Bossing & Ai earned a 4.6% rating. While the final episode scored a 4% rating.

Accolades

References

External links
 
 

2017 Philippine television series debuts
2018 Philippine television series endings
Filipino-language television shows
GMA Network original programming
Philippine game shows